Manjula de Zoysa (born 11 July 1983) is a Sri Lankan cricketer. He made his first-class debut for Singha Sports Club in the 2003–04 Premier Trophy on 28 February 2004.

References

External links
 

1983 births
Living people
Sri Lankan cricketers
Galle Cricket Club cricketers
Singha Sports Club cricketers
Sri Lanka Army Sports Club cricketers
People from Western Province, Sri Lanka